Baumanskaya:

 Baumanskaya (Moscow Metro)
 Baumanskaya (street)
 Baumana Street (disambiguation)

See also 
 Bauman Garden
 Bauman Lane